Stephan Thiemonds (born April 5, 1971 in Lendersdorf/Düren, North Rhine-Westphalia), is a German author, who writes travelogues and short stories in the style of Gonzo Journalism.

Life 
Thiemonds trained as a coppersmith and a welder at GEA Cancler GmbH in Düren, and later qualified as a construction foreman and a European Welding Specialist (EWF). Since 2003 he has travelled across the world working for Buss SMS Canzler GmbH, based in Butzbach, Germany, a manufacturer of industrial machines, specialised in process engineering. Numerous professional and personal journeys to all continents inspired him to write his semi-autobiographical short stories. In the summer of 2002 he began a bike journey that lasted many months, and took him all the way to Australia. He was sponsored on this endeavour, with people pledging €1 for every kilometer cycled. The monies collected were donated to the fund for the restoration of a fire-damaged spire that forms part of Merode Castle, the most famous landmark of his hometown of Merode, municipality of Langerwehe.

Since 2012 Thiemonds has lived with his partner and their daughter in Darmstadt. In 2015 he moved back to his origin home country Langerwehe. In 2017 he incorporated as a German Ambassador the not-for-profit organization Child's Dream.

359° - The Workaday Life Of An Industrial Gypsy 
A selection of his short stories from his German “Querweltein – Unterwegs“ series of books has been translated into English. It contains stories from China, Taiwan, Thailand, South Korea, Iran, Colombia, Antarctica, Denmark, Turkey, Sweden, Finland, Great Britain, Germany, from “Seventh Heaven“ and from “Above Clouds“.In 2016 a revised 359° edition was published in India.

Cover 

The cover of the English edition shows a hard hat held upside down. On its front, also wrong way up, the logo of the machinery and plant engineering company Buss SMS Canzler GmbH is depicted. As is usual in the international industry sector, the logo on the front serves to identify the wearer’s company affiliation. Within the helmet rests the earth, resembling an egg in an egg cup. 

The angle measurement of 359° in the book title is meant to express that no man-made workmanship will ever achieve perfection (the geometric unit of a turn). The subheadingYou’ll Never Work Alone is borrowed in slightly altered form from the song title "You'll Never Walk Alone".

Works 
 2003 Querweltein – Eine Radreise voller Gegensätze (New Edition 2013 ), 
 2005 Querweltein – Unterwegs: Schrauben, Spesen und Chinesen, 
 2008 Querweltein – Unterwegs: Trotz Überstunden die Welt erkunden, 
 2010 Querweltein – Unterwegs: Seemannsgarn oder Sabotage in der Antarktis, 
 2015 Querweltein – Unterwegs: Berufsalltag oder Alltagsflucht, 
 2015 Querweltein – Unterwegs: Die Entdeckung der Erfinderkinder, Iatros, Sonnefeld, 
 2015 Querweltein – Unterwegs: Schweißen verbindet, Iatros, Sonnefeld, .

In English:
 2012 359° - Workadays Life Of An Industrial Gypsy – You’ll never work alone!, 
 2016 359° – Worker, Writer, World-traveller – You’ll never work alone!. Notionpress, India, .

In Chinese:
 2016 环游地球359°一位德国工程师的工业之旅》你不是一个人在奋斗！ (englisch, 359° - Workdays Life Of An Industrial Gypsy) Intellectual Property Publishing House, Beijing, .

See also 
Merode and Schloss Merode on the German-language Wikipedia
Querweltein Unterwegs on the German-language Wikipedia

References

External links 
 Literatur by and about Stephan Thiemonds in the catalogue of the German National Library
 Buss SMS Canzler GmbH Website
 Merode Castle Website
 Web site about the bike trip around the world

1971 births
Living people
German male writers